The Parliament 1640–1649, also called Parliament 1639–1648 using an unadjusted Old Style (O.S.) calendar, was the second of the two Irish parliaments of King Charles I of England. It voted taxes in 1640 and was then overshadowed by the Irish Rebellion of 1641. It was legally dissolved by the King's death in 1649.

Background 
The Parliament was called by the Earl of Strafford, the Lord Lieutenant of Ireland, because of King Charles I's need to raise funds and men to fight against the Scots in the Second Bishops' War.

The main item on the agenda therefore was taxation.

Proceedings

1st Session 

Parliament was opened on 16 March 1640 by Christopher Wandesford, whom the Lord Lieutenant Strafford had appointed his Lord Deputy. On that same day the parliament elected Sir Maurice Eustace, one of the two members for Kildare County, as speaker. Strafford arrived two days later. The parliament then unanimously voted four subsidies of £45,000 (about £ in ) to raise an Irish army of 9000 for use by the King against the Scots in the Second Bishops' War. On 31 March Strafford prorogued parliament until the first week of June. On 3 April 1640 Strafford left Ireland.

2nd Session 
Lord Deputy Wandesford opened the 2nd Session on 1 June. News from England was the Short Parliament had refused subsidies to the King. The Irish MPs regretted having voted subsidies and wanted to sabotage their action by changing how the subsidies would be evaluated and collected. After two weeks of inconclusive discussions, Wandesford prorogued parliament on 17 June.

3rd Session 
Parliament reconvened on 1 October 1640 for its 3rd Session. The Commons created a committee for grievances. The committee prepared a remonstrance (complaint) against Strafford, that was then approved by the House of Commons. This remonstrance is also called the "November Petition". Wandesford prorogued parliament on 12 November, a day after Strafford's impeachment in Westminster by the Long Parliament. A delegation of 13 MPs, headed by Audley Mervyn, travelled to London to submit the remonstrance to the King, arriving on 21 November. On 12 November Wandesford prorogued Parliament until 26 January 1641. The Irish House of Lords had not acted on grievances during the 3rd Session, but after its prorogation some Lords decided to send Gormanston, Dillon, Kilmallock, and Muskerry to London to present separate Lords' grievances.

4th Session 
The Irish Parliament met in its 4th Session on 26 January 1641. Lord Deputy Wandesford had died on 3 December and the Irish government had devolved upon the Lords Justices, Parsons and Borlase. The Lords recognised its members who had gone to London as one of its committees. On 18 February the Lords' grievances were written up in 18 articles. The main complaint was that Strafford had overtaxed them.

On 20 February 1641, Muskerry, aged about 70, died in London during his parliamentary mission. His son, Charles MacCarty, one of the two MPs of County Cork, succeeded his father at the Lords. In the resulting byelection Redmond Roche was elected to his seat at the Commons. Muskerry's place in the Lords' delegation in London stayed vacant until 3 March when the Lords appointed Thomas Roper, 2nd Viscount Baltinglass in his stead. The Lords Justices prorogued parliament on 6 March.

5th Session 
On 11 May 1641 parliament reconvened for its 5th session. The Catholic MPs tried to impeach Loftus, the chancellor, and Ranelagh, the vice-president of Connaught, but failed.

Expulsions and cessation 
In June 1642 Sir Robert Lynch and Redmond Roche (on 22nd) were expelled from parliament for having joined the rebels. There must have been others in the same case.

The sessions of the Parliament ceased in 1647 when Marquess of Ormond handed Dublin over to the Parliamentarians, but King Charles I never formally dissolved the parliament.

Legally, the Parliament is considered dissolved by King Charles I's execution in 1649.

See also 
 List of Acts of the Parliament of Ireland to 1700
 List of Irish MPs 1639–1649
 List of parliaments of Ireland

Notes and references

Notes

Citations

Sources 

 
 
  – 1603 to 1642
  – 1613 to 1641
  – 1640 to 1641
 
  – 1611 to 1625
  – (for timeline)
  – 1639 to 1641
 
 
  – 1634 to 1699
 
 
  – Parliaments & Biographies (PDF downloadable from given URL)
  – House of Lords
  – House of Commons
 
  – (Preview)
 
 

Parliament of Ireland
Charles I of England
17th-century Irish monarchs
House of Stuart